S. Harrison "Sonny" Dogole (16 January 1922 – 13 December 1999) was president of Globe Security Systems, in Philadelphia. Globe was a major private detective agency in the United States.

Because Dogole was a heavy contributor to the Hubert Humphrey campaign, and because of fears that he would use his company to investigate Richard M. Nixon, as a result he was placed on Nixon's Enemies List.

Dogole retired in 1989 and died in Wellington, Florida.

References

1922 births
1999 deaths
Nixon's Enemies List
Private detectives and investigators

20th-century American businesspeople